Michael Solomonov (born 1978) is an Israeli chef known for his restaurants in Center City, Philadelphia. His first restaurant Zahav, founded in 2008, has received national recognition including the James Beard Foundation "Outstanding Restaurant" in 2019. Solomonov was also awarded Best Chef: Mid-Atlantic in 2011, Cookbook of the Year in 2016, and Outstanding Chef in 2017 from the James Beard Foundation. In 2021, The New York Times named his restaurant Laser Wolf as one of "the 50 places in America we're most excited about right now."

Early life
Solomonov was born in moshav Ganei Yehuda, Israel, to a family of Bulgarian-Jewish descent. He was raised in Pittsburgh, where he attended Taylor Allderdice High School. At the age of 18, he returned to Israel with no Hebrew language skills, taking the only job he could get – working in a bakery – and his culinary career was born.

Career
At the start of his career, Solomonov moved back to the United States to attend culinary school at the Florida Culinary Institute in West Palm Beach, FL. He then moved to Philadelphia, Pennsylvania to cook Italian cuisine at Chef Marc Vetri's upscale Italian restaurants. Afterwards, Solomonov took a job as a chef at Marigold Kitchen, owned by businessman Steve Cook. Cook and Solomonov then opened the upscale Mexican restaurant Xochitl and later co-founded the restaurant group CooknSolo.

In 2003, his brother David was killed on Yom Kippur during an Israel Defense Forces military campaign on the border of Lebanon by three enemy snipers, for which he volunteered. Solomonov decided to change his focus to Israeli and Jewish cuisine. With the support of financier Steve Cook, Solomonov opened Zahav in 2008.

With his business partner Steven Cook, Solomonov is co-owner of several Philadelphia restaurants: Abe Fisher, Dizengoff, Percy Street Barbecue, Laser Wolf, and Federal Donuts, a fried chicken and donut chain.  Having participated in the South Beach Food & Wine Festival in 2013, Solomonov was able to bring Percy Street Barbecue to South Florida. Bill Addison, writing for Eater Philadelphia, called Chef Solomonov "the Genius of Modern Jewish Cooking" after eating at Abe Fisher, Dizengoff, and Zahav.

Solomonov also spent a period of time consulting for David Magerman's, now closed, and Citron and Rose, a certified Kosher meat restaurant on the Main Line in Bala Cynwyd, Pennsylvania.

In 2015, Cook and Solomonov published a cookbook based on their restaurant Zahav. Zahav: A World of Israeli Cuisine was nominated for a James Beard Foundation Book Award in the International cookbook category. Its recipe for hummus was chosen as "2015 dish of the year" by Bon Appétit.

Awards

 "Best Chef: Mid-Atlantic" (2011) by the James Beard Foundation
 "Cookbook of the Year" for Zahav: A World of Israeli Cooking (2016) by the James Beard Foundation
 "Outstanding Chef" (2017) by the James Beard Foundation
 "Outstanding Restaurant" for Zahav (2019) by the James Beard Foundation
 "The Restaurant List" for Laser Wolf (2021), one of 50 restaurants included by The New York Times

References

Israeli chefs
Israeli people of Bulgarian-Jewish descent
1978 births
Living people
Jewish cuisine
James Beard Foundation Award winners
Jewish American chefs
American male chefs
American chefs
Chefs from Pennsylvania
Businesspeople from Philadelphia
Jewish American writers
American cookbook writers
Israeli non-fiction writers
21st-century American non-fiction writers
Israeli Jews
21st-century American Jews